José Manuel García Buitrón (14 June 1945 – 17 September 2022) was a Spanish doctor and politician. A member of the Spanish Socialist Workers' Party, he served in the Senate of Spain from 2015 to 2016.

García died in Madrid on 17 September 2022, at the age of 77.

References

1945 births
2022 deaths
20th-century Spanish physicians
Members of the 11th Senate of Spain
Spanish Socialist Workers' Party politicians
University of Santiago de Compostela alumni
People from El Bierzo